Heo Seung (Hangul: 허승, born May 7, 1991), better known by his stage name Justhis (Hangul: 저스디스), is a South Korean rapper. He released his first album, 2 Many Homes 4 1 Kid, on June 14, 2016. He is a member of crew IMJMWDP and is currently signed to GROOVL1N.

Discography

Studio albums

Instrumental/Remix albums

Collaborative albums

Charted singles

Filmography

Television show

Notes

References

1991 births
Living people
South Korean male rappers
South Korean hip hop singers
21st-century South Korean male  singers